Isaac López Mendizabal (11 April 1879 – 27 February 1977) was a historian, intellectual, publisher, editor, and politician in Basque Country, Spain.

Career 
López Mendizabal was president of the highest of the Partido Nacionalista Vasco (PNV), the Euzkadi Buru Batzar (EBB), from 1931 to 1935.

He was a Doctor of Philosophy and Letters & Law, with a degree in Business Sciences from the University of Deusto. He was a prominent PNV militant, whose leadership presided over much of the Second Republic period. He was a councilor in his hometown, elected in 1931.

After the occupation of the Basque Country by Francoist troops, he went into exile in France while his library was looted and burned by the occupying troops. Later he emigrated to Argentina, where he founded the Ekin publishing house with Andrés de Irujo. He served as Chair of Law at the University of Buenos Aires until his return to Spain in 1965 to start his own printing company.

He was the author of numerous historical studies, a member of the group that created the Royal Academy of the Basque Language, and an advocate of Euskera for which he published dictionaries and manuals.

Works 

 Cantabria, the Cantabrian War and the Basque Country in the time of Augustus (doctoral thesis in Philosophy and Letters).
 Fueros de Guipúzcoa (doctoral thesis on law).
 Aita Santu amargarren Pio'ren doctriña laburra (1904)
 Spanish-Basque conversation manual (1908)
 Basque-Castilian Dictionary (1916)
 Xabiertxo
 The comic "Poxpolin" (1935)
 The Basque Language, Grammar. Conversation, Dictionary (1943)
 Brief History of the Basque Country (1946)
 Abbreviated Grammar (1954)

References 

1879 births
1977 deaths
People from Tolosa, Spain
20th-century Spanish historians
Spanish editors
Exiles of the Spanish Civil War in France
Basque Nationalist Party politicians
University of Deusto alumni
Spanish emigrants to Argentina
Spanish publishers (people)
Academic staff of the University of Buenos Aires
Basque-language writers